Rafael Heredia Estrella (19 February 1937 – 28 January 2021) was a Mexican basketball player who competed in the 1964 Summer Olympics and in the 1968 Summer Olympics.

References

1937 births
2021 deaths
Basketball players at the 1964 Summer Olympics
Basketball players at the 1967 Pan American Games
Basketball players at the 1968 Summer Olympics
Mexican men's basketball players
1963 FIBA World Championship players
1967 FIBA World Championship players
Olympic basketball players of Mexico
Basketball players from Mexico City
Pan American Games medalists in basketball
Pan American Games silver medalists for Mexico
Medalists at the 1967 Pan American Games